Renlund is a surname. Notable people with the surname include:

Dale G. Renlund (born 1952), American cardiologist and leader in the Church of Jesus Christ of Latter-day Saints
Liza Renlund (born 1997), Swedish footballer

Swedish-language surnames